Beltola is a prime residential area in the southern part of Guwahati, Assam. 
Mythical sources claimed that the word Beltola comes from the word Bilvapatra, which means leaves of Bael tree, used in religious ceremonies. It was said that in olden day's large quantities of Bael tree leaves were sent to Kamakhya Temple to be used in rituals. It was from that time the place is called as Beltola.

It is an adjoining area of the Dispur Capital Complex, the capital of Assam. The area has seen rapid growth since the 1980s and its southern periphery is today extended up to the National Highway-27 (NH-27) in the extreme south of the city.
It covers an area of about 2.53 km2 or 27,221,804.44 ft².

Beltola Bazar, located in the central part of Beltola, is a bi-weekly market for fruits and vegetables with historical significance. The market dates back to the period of Ahom rule and serves as a traditional trading point between the people of the Garo and Khasi hills (Meghalaya) and the local community. The market offers a variety of local food products.

Previously, Beltola was also the seat for a small protectorate of Ahom Kingdom, principally assisting administration of the Borphukan and in maintaining relations with the communities of Khasi Hills. The Rani or the Queen of Beltola is a popular historic figure in the locality.

On November 24, 2007, an Adivasi rally turned violent, leading to arson and violent confrontations that left 1 person dead and 230 others injured. The events preceding the violence in Beltola are unclear. Raphael Kujurd, vice-president of the All Adivasi Students’ Association of Assam, has stated that he believes the Adivasi National Liberation Army (ANLA) and the Birsa Commando Force, both Adivasi militant groups, may have been involved.

History
During the Ahom reign, the kingdom of Beltola extends from the borders of the kingdom of Rani in the west, while in the east it extends to the borders of the kingdom of Mayong and Dimorua. The places named as Rajgarh and Hatigarh in present-day Guwahati city, were the borders between Ahom ruled Guwahati city and the kingdom of Beltola. After the fall of Ahom kingdom and the British occupation of Assam, Beltola lost its status as a kingdom and converted into a Mouza or revenue circle. Under British rule, the size of the Beltola Mouza was much reduced. Presently Beltola Mouza consists of several places of Modern day Guwahati city. Centrally located from Beltola haat or Beltola Bazaar, the Mouza or estate covers the area of Narengi, Birkuchi, Hengrabari, Panjabari, Hatigaon, Bhetapara, Maidam gaon, Rukminigaon, Khanapara,  Kahilipara, Ganeshguri and Basistha Temple. It was said that the Royal residence of the Beltola royal family was in Rukminigaon, while the place where the royal elephants were kept and trained was Hatigaon, literally meaning village of elephants (in Assamese Hati means elephant; gaon means village). Maidam gaon was said to be the place of cremation of the royal family members. The old name of Khanapara was Kainapara. Kaina is a Khasi word, which means elephant, while Para in Khasi language means human settlements or colony. It was said that the ruler of Beltola used to capture elephants and was indulge in the profitable business of selling elephants. It is assumed that the Khasi people who lived in that region were involved in the capture of elephants for the rulers of Beltola, which gave rise to the names Kainapara and, later, Khanapara. Birkuchi name comes from the combination of two words, Bir means heroes and Kuchi means camp. It was said that the Koch army of Chilarai use to camp there for some time and thus the place got its name.

Over time, Beltola has expanded as a residential area come commercial and educational hub with Beltola College as the institute offering graduate courses in Arts and Science. A sub-centre of the All Assam Students Union known as Beltola Students Union and is active in various activities.

Landmark
The proposed Twin Tower World Trade Centre project in Beltola, set to be completed in the near future, will be a 280 meter (918.635 foot) tall complex featuring 65 floors with a cinema, shopping mall, convention centre, auditorium, seminar rooms, food courts, outdoor amphitheatre, museum, commercial and residential offices, service apartments, and a 200 meter tall sky park covering 2 acres. The sky park will include a public observatory, restaurant with views of the city, the Brahmaputra River, and surrounding hills. The project, which is being developed by the National Buildings Construction Corporation Ltd. (NBCC) at a cost of approximately 2500 crore rupees, is intended to serve as a major landmark for not only Beltola, but the entire northeast region.

Place of Interest
 THE CRIMSON VALLEY Restaurant
 Beltola Bazar
 Rani Bagan
 MATRIX MALL
 CARNIVAL CINEMAS
 Reliance Market
 JDDS Supermarket
 AG Office
 Bongaon Playground
 Bongaon Shiv Temple
 Megha Mart
 Lakhi Mandir
 Vishnu Mandir

Notes

The Beltola market opens two times a week (Thursdays and Sundays) from the morning till late in the evening.

Beltola has a long history. It was, until about half a century ago, the hub of a small kingdom, the kingdom of Beltola. Close to the site of the famous "Beltola-haat", where small local vendors sell their agricultural produce and other goods of small-scale manufacturing twice a week, lived the royal family of the Beltola kings. Within living memory, there was a royal mansion/palace with the royal gardens. The Beltola-haat has been almost monumental for the inhabitants of greater Guwahati in that it has always been known to everyone here that the items that cannot be found in any other market in Guwahati, are likely to be sold here. Being located at a point convenient of access for vendors who came on foot and animal-transport from far-off places like present-day Meghalaya, this market retained its distinctive, indigenous character till about a decade ago before the high-rise apartment complexes were built. Even today this character is not entirely lost.

Beltola Bazaar

Today, Beltola Bazaar has become a daily market selling everything from clothes to vegetables. But, starting from Wednesday night to Thursday night and Saturday night to Sunday night from Vegetables to fruits, clothing, fast foods, home items, foot wear, women's apparel, toys, pastries all are available in Market ( Haat ).

 History of Beltola
 Ulubari
 Paltan Bazaar
 Ganeshguri
 Chandmari
 Maligaon
 Bhetapara

References

Neighbourhoods in Guwahati